Frank W. Dunham Jr. (c. 1942 – November 3, 2006 in Alexandria, Virginia) was a federal public defender who represented a number of high profile defendants, including Zacarias Moussaoui, the only person charged and convicted after the September 11, 2001 attacks.

Education and early career
Dunham was a graduate of Virginia Tech and the Columbus School of Law at The Catholic University of America. He had been a federal prosecutor and defense lawyer in Northern Virginia before becoming the federal public defender for the Eastern District of Virginia in 2001.

Legal
Dunham was instrumental in the federal government's release of Yaser Esam Hamdi.  By the time Moussaoui went to trial in early 2006, Dunham was too ill to participate in the case.

Death
Dunham died on November 3, 2006 in his home in Alexandria, VA; the cause was brain cancer. Dunham was married to his wife Elinor, and had two sons and one grandson.

References

1942 births
2006 deaths
Lawyers from Alexandria, Virginia
20th-century American lawyers
Virginia Tech alumni
Columbus School of Law alumni
Deaths from brain cancer in the United States
Public defenders
American prosecutors